The 2021–22 Girabola is the 44th season of top-tier football in Angola. The season is running from October 1st 2021 until May 2022.

The league comprises 16 teams, the bottom three of which will be relegated to the 2022–23 Provincial stages.

The winner and runner-up will qualify to the 2022–23 CAF Champions League qualifications round.

Managerial changes

League table

Results

Statistics

Top scorers

Hat-tricks

Stadiums

Notes

References

External links
 Match schedule

Girabola seasons
Girabola
Angola